Parit Bunga (Jawi: ڤاريت بوڠا) is a small town in Mukim Kesang, Tangkak District, Johor, Malaysia. It is located on the Muar River and on the intersection between the roads to Malacca and Tangkak.

References

Towns, suburbs and villages in Tangkak